Kitaysky Tank (Chinese tank) is the first solo-album of the Russian rock musician Armen Grigoryan and 3'Angel. The group is named so because this is the third team of Armen Grigoryan.

History
The album was released in May 2006 and included 12 completely new songs. Two of them, "Chinese tank" and "Ragtime", were already well known to fans as they had a constant rotation on Nashe Radio, Radio Russia and radio "Silver Rain". These songs were used in the series "The students" on the Ren-TV.

Track listing
 Freddy Krueger
 Agni Yoga
 Chinese tank
 L'amour De Trois
 Student-hermit
 My horse 
 Insanity is inevitable
 XXXL
 Dear father
 It's the End, Sveta!
 King-talker
 Regtime (bonus track)
 Agni-yoga (remix) (bonus track)
 Chinese Tank (bonus track)

References

External links
 3' Angel official website 

2006 albums
Armen Grigoryan albums